Gorman High School is a public high school located in Gorman, Texas (USA) and classified as a 1A school by the UIL.  It is part of the Gorman Independent School District located in southeast Eastland County.   In 2015, the school was rated "Met Standard" by the Texas Education Agency.

Athletics
The Gorman Panthers compete in these sports - 

Volleyball, 6-man football, Basketball, Track, Baseball & Softball

State Titles
Football - 
1976(B)

See also

List of high schools in Texas

References

External links
Gorman ISD

Schools in Eastland County, Texas
Public high schools in Texas
Public middle schools in Texas